Champneys is an English country house near Wigginton, Hertfordshire, run as a "destination spa", and the brand name of the associated chain of spas.

Champneys may also refer to:

Champneys, Newfoundland and Labrador, a community in Canada
Champneys baronets, two baronetcies created for persons with the surname Champneys
Mostyn-Champneys baronets, a title in the Baronetage of Great Britain
Dalrymple-Champneys baronets, a title in the Baronetage of the United Kingdom

People
A. M. Champneys (1888–1966), British novelist and poet
Basil Champneys (1842–1935), British architect and author
Benjamin Champneys (1800–1871), American lawyer, judge, and legislator
Sir Francis Champneys, 1st Baronet (1848–1930), British obstetrician
Sir John Champneys (1495–1566), English merchant and Lord Mayor of London
Weldon Champneys (1832–1892), English clergyman and rower
Sir Weldon Dalrymple-Champneys, 2nd Baronet (1892–1980), British physician

See also
Champney, a surname